Kim Crosby (born December 8, 1964) is an American stock car racing driver, professional driving instructor, and monster truck driver. She is a former competitor in the NASCAR Busch Series and the ARCA Re/Max Series.

Career
Before she became a NASCAR driver, she served as a middle school principal in Slidell, Louisiana, resigning in December 2004 to focus full-time on her racing career. Kim has a master's degree in Educational Administration.

Crosby originally was a drag racer, competing in the NHRA and IHRA for fifteen years. She began oval racing in 2000 at the Buck Baker Driving School, where she graduated in the advanced class. She would later return to work at the school as an instructor at the school's satellites at Bristol Motor Speedway, Atlanta Motor Speedway, and Darlington Raceway. She also ran the Florida Fast Trucks Series.  Kim has also completed the Advanced Driving School at Bob Bondurant School of High Performance Driving.

In 2003, she made her debut in the ARCA RE/MAX Series, where her best finish came in her first start, a 21st at Kentucky Speedway. She ran two more races that year in the ARCA Series. In 2004, she was signed to drive the #28 for Black Cat Racing, but left the team during Speedweeks. She ended up making her Busch Series debut at Talladega Superspeedway, finishing 20th in the #51 Boudreaux's Butt Paste Dodge owned by Ware Racing Enterprises. She ran three more races for Ware that season, her best finish coming in her Talladega debut. She closed out the year running for ORTEC Motorsports, finishing 38th at the Aaron's 312.

She signed to drive for GIC-Mixon Motorsports in 2005, driving the #24 Butt Paste Chevrolet. Her best finish with this team was a 35th at Atlanta Motor Speedway. By mid-season, she left GIC and signed to drive the #26 Chevrolet for Keith Coleman Racing, finishing 28th at Daytona International Speedway. After a very tumultuous time with KCR, Crosby resigned from the team to pursue other opportunities.

In 2006, it was announced she would run a part-time schedule for Frank Cicci Racing with Jim Kelly. She made her first and only start for the team in June at the Milwaukee Mile, starting 41st after crashing the ill-handling car during qualifying, then finishing 40th after suffering electrical problems and being forced to the garage early in the race. The team shut down shortly thereafter due to business and sponsorship issues, allowing Kim only the one ill-fated start for the team.

In 2008, she was listed as one of the drivers for the #15 truck for Billy Ballew Motorsports in the NASCAR Craftsman Truck Series as a teammate to Kyle Busch.  Sponsorship never materialized, however, and Kim was unable to make a start for the team.

As of 2009, Crosby has been a driver for Monster Jam, piloting the monster trucks known as Monster Mutt Dalmatian and Madusa (normally driven by fellow extreme athlete Debrah Miceli) in Central America as part of Monster Jam's World Tour. She continues to pursue sponsorship for her own Monster Jam theme truck and plans to reenter the NASCAR ranks if the right opportunity arises.

Crosby is an avid outdoorswoman.  When not racing, she prefers to be hunting, fishing, hiking, kayaking and camping. She currently resides in Kentucky.

Motorsports career results

NASCAR
(key) (Bold – Pole position awarded by qualifying time. Italics – Pole position earned by points standings or practice time. * – Most laps led.)

Busch Series

ARCA Re/Max Series
(key) (Bold – Pole position awarded by qualifying time. Italics – Pole position earned by points standings or practice time. * – Most laps led.)

References

External links

Living people
1964 births
Sportspeople from Tallahassee, Florida
Racing drivers from Florida
NASCAR drivers
ARCA Menards Series drivers
American female racing drivers
Dragster drivers
Monster truck drivers
People from Slidell, Louisiana
21st-century American women